IDN.IDN is an abbreviation for an Internationalized domain name whose Top level domain (TLD) is also internationalized, which could be transliterated .com, .net, .org, etc. or be groupings relevant to the language at hand.

Culturally relevant proposals
 Chinese:
 Korean:
 Japanese:
 Russian:
 Hebrew:
 שלום.דבר : shalom.dbr (dbr being roots of the verb 'to talk')
 דפנה.שלי : daphne.shli (shli being a preposition 'of me,' for personal homepages, etc.)
 Arabic:
 كوم : .com
 نت : .net
 اورج : .org

Concerns and considerations
As this is an issue still being "decided upon," (for many years, apparently) there are many factors to be considered. Here are a few just thrown out to be edited around and made to look pretty.
 IDN.COM vs. IDN.IDN, important issue as IDN.COM is already available.
 Compatibility
 Punycode
 "branching off from the *main* internet" (various POVs)
 Who Owns The Internet
 The UN Resolution from meeting in Tunisia
 Localization
 Transliteration of COM NET ORG vs. culturally significant TLD names of the languages' own choosing.
 Right-to-left formatted languages such as Arabic and Hebrew

External links
 ICANN's IDN Committee
 Proposal for the Implementation of Internationalized TLDs
 IDN Guide
 IDN News
 Korean Government Position on IDN TLDs
 IDN's Forum
 Local Domains Forum
 International Domain Forum

Domain Name System